The Sol Akins Farm near Statesboro in Bulloch County, Georgia dates from c.1864.  It was listed on the National Register of Historic Places in 1990.

The Sol Akins House is a two-story Plantation Plain-style house with brick exterior chimneys at its ends, and a rear ell, and a Z-shaped back porch.  It was added in the 1880s onto an original c.1864 one-story four-room dogtrot log house.  The listing includes a second contributing building, which is a c. 1864 double-crib log barn, and a cemetery.

It is located on private property.

References

National Register of Historic Places in Georgia (U.S. state)
Buildings and structures completed in 1864
Bulloch County, Georgia
Historic districts in Georgia (U.S. state)